Franktown is an unincorporated community and census-designated place in Northampton County, Virginia, United States. It was first listed as a CDP in the 2020 census with a population of 61.

In the mid-19th century, it was a point along the stagecoach route between Wilmington, Delaware and Eastville, Virginia.

The Glebe of Hungar's Parish was listed on the National Register of Historic Places in 1970.

Fannie Salter and her husband lived in Franktown for a time in the 1920s before moving to Turkey Point Light in Maryland; their son Charles Bradley was born there. Blues musician Arthur Crudup is buried in Franktown, as is politician Peter J. Carter.

References

GNIS reference

Unincorporated communities in Virginia
Unincorporated communities in Northampton County, Virginia
Census-designated places in Virginia
Census-designated places in Northampton County, Virginia